Hatta Club is a sports club based in Hatta in the Emirate of Dubai, UAE, founded in 1981. It is most widely known for its professional football team, which currently plays in the UAE Pro League.

Current squad

As of UAE First Division League:

Honors

Domestic
UAE Division One 
Champions (1): 2015–16

Pro-League record

Notes 2019–20 UAE football season was cancelled due to the COVID-19 pandemic in the United Arab Emirates.

Key
 Pos. = Position
 Tms. = Number of teams
 Lvl. = League

References

External links
Kooora profile 
Soccerway profile
Futbol24 profile

Football clubs in Dubai
Hatta